Stone is a surname of Old English origin which means Stone.

List of people with the surname

A 
Adam Stone, American professor and political scientist 
Alan Stone (disambiguation), several people, including
Alan A. Stone (1929–2022), American scholar of law and psychology at Harvard, and film critic
Alan Stone (opera director) (1929–2008), founder of the Chicago Opera Theater
Alan Stone (wrestler) (born 1977), Mexican professional wrestler
Albert Stone (born 1916), owner of Sterilite and a philanthropist from Townsend, Massachusetts
Alfred Stone (disambiguation), several people, including:
Alfred Stone (musician) (1840–1878), English organist and choir-trainer
Alfred Stone (1834–1908), American architect from Rhode Island; partner in Stone, Carpenter & Willson
Alfred Holt Stone (1879–1955), American planter, writer, politician, from Mississippi
Alfred P. Stone (1813–1865), American politician from Ohio
Allan Stone (born 1945), Australian tennis player
Allen Stone (born 1987), American musician
Amy Wentworth Stone (1876–1938), American children's book author
Andrew Stone (disambiguation), several people
Andrew Stone, Baron Stone of Blackheath (born 1942), Labour member of the House of Lords
Andrew Stone (cricketer) (born 1983), Zimbabwean cricketer
Andrew Stone (field hockey), represented United States at the 1984 Summer Olympics
Andrew Stone (footballer) for Indy Eleven
Andrew Stone (MP) (1703–1773), British MP for Hastings, 1741–1761
Andrew Stone (Pineapple Dance Studios), dance instructor, cast member of English reality TV series
Andrew Stone (sailor), participated in Sailing at the 1996 Summer Olympics – Men's 470
Andrew A. Stone (born 1885), head football coach for the University of Tennessee, 1910
Andrew C. Stone (born 1956), American computer programmer
Andrew H. Stone, American judge in the State of Utah
Andrew L. Stone (1902–1999), American screenwriter, director, and producer
Andrew Leete Stone (1815–1892), author, Civil War chaplain and pastor
Angie Stone (born 1961), American R&B singer
Anthony Stone, British theoretical chemist
Arthur Stone (disambiguation), several people, including:
Arthur Stone (priest) (died 1927), Irish-English Anglican priest and Archdeacon of Calcutta
Arthur J. Stone (1847–1938), American silversmith
Arthur Burr Stone (1874–1943), American aviation pioneer
Arthur Stone (actor) (1883–1940), American film actor
Arthur Thomas Stone (1897–1988), politician in Saskatchewan, Canada
Arthur Harold Stone (1916–2000), British mathematician 
Arthur Stone (rugby union) (born 1960), New Zealand rugby union player

B 
Barton Warren Stone (1772–1844), preacher during the Second Great Awakening of the early 19th century
Bernard Stone (born 1927), alderman of the 50th Ward in Chicago
Bill Stone (footballer) (1894–1975), Australian rules footballer for Fitzroy
Bill Stone (politician) (born 1965), member of the Mississippi State Senate
Bill Stone (Royal Navy sailor) (1900–2009) British veteran of WWI and WWII
Billy Stone (American football) (1925–2004), running back
Billy Stone (arena football) (born 1963), American football fullback
Billy Stone (Australian footballer) (1901–1993), Australian rules footballer for Carlton
Billy Stone (rugby league), English rugby union and rugby league footballer who played in the 1910s and 1920s
Biz Stone (Christopher Isaac Stone, born 1974), American entrepreneur who co-founded Twitter

C 
Carl Stone (born 1953), American composer
Charles Stone (disambiguation), several people, including
Sir Charles Stone (mayor) (1850–1931), mayor of Greenwich, England, 1915–1920
Charles Stone III (born 1966), American film director, son of Chuck Stone
Charles B. Stone III (1904–1992), United States Air Force general
Charles D. Stone (1920–1992), Pennsylvania politician
Charles Edwin Stone (1889–1952), English recipient of the Victoria Cross
Charles Joel Stone (1936–2019), American statistician and mathematician 
Charles Stone (English cricketer) (1865–1951), English cricketer
Charles Stone (New Zealand cricketer) (1866–1903), New Zealand cricketer
Charles Stone (priest) (died 1799), Anglican priest in Ireland
Charles P. Stone (1915–2012), American major general and commander of the 4th Infantry Division in the Vietnam War
Charles Pomeroy Stone (1824–1887), Union general during the American Civil War
Charles Warren Stone (1843–1912), United States Representative from and Lieutenant Governor of Pennsylvania
Charlie Stone (rugby league) (1950–2018), English rugby league player
Cheryl Stone, South African-born co-founder of Bangarra Dance Theatre, an Indigenous dance company in Australia
Chic Stone (1923–2000), comic book artist
Chris Stone (Animation Director), Animation director of Dead Space (video game) and other games
Chris Stone (entrepreneur), co-founder of the Record Plant recording studios
Chris Stone (footballer) (born 1959), Australian rules footballer
Chris Stone (sprinter) (born 1995), British sprint athlete and runner-up at the 2019 British Indoor Athletics Championships
Christopher Stone (disambiguation), several people, including
Christopher Stone (MP) (1556–1614), English politician
Christopher Stone (actor) (1942–1995), American actor
Christopher Stone (broadcaster) (1882–1965), first disc jockey in the United Kingdom
Christopher Stone (cricketer) (born 1951), English cricketer
Christopher Stone (criminal justice expert), American criminal justice expert
 Christopher Stone, Research Director, Centre for Policy Development, Australia 
 Christopher Stone, contestant in series 4 of Britain's Got Talent
C.J. Stone (Christopher James Stone, born 1953), author, journalist and freelance writer
Chuck Stone (born 1924), journalist and Tuskegee airman

Clara Stone Fields Collins (1908–1981), Alabama legislator
Cliffie Stone (1917–1998), American country singer, musician, record producer, music publisher, and radio and TV personality
Clyde E. Stone (1876–1948), American jurist
Curt Stone (born 1922), American long-distance runner

D 
Daren Stone (born 1985), National Football League defensive back for Atlanta Falcons
Dave Stone (born 1964), British author of several Dr. Who and Judge Dredd spin-off novels
David Stone (disambiguation), several people, including
David B. Stone (1927–2010), American businessman
David E. Stone (born 1947), American sound editor
David Henry Stone (1812–1890), Lord Mayor of London in 1874
David John Anthony Stone (born 1947), British Army officer and military historian
David Lee Stone (born 1978), British fantasy author
David R. Stone (born 1968), American military historian
David Scott Stone, musician
David Stone (cyclist) (born 1981), British cyclist
David Stone (footballer) (born 1942), English footballer
David Stone (keyboardist) (born 1952), keyboardist
David Stone (magician) (born 1972), French magician
David Stone (politician) (1770–1818), American politician, Governor of North Carolina and U.S. Senator
David Stone (producer) (born 1966), American theatre and musical producer</onlyinclude>
Dean Stone (1929–2018), Major League Baseball pitcher
Don Stone (publisher), DJ, publisher and businessman
Donnie Stone, American football player
Donna J. Stone (1933–1994), American poet and philanthropist
Doug Stone (born 1956), American country singer
Doug Stone (voice actor) (born 1950), Canadian voice actor
Douglas Stone (disambiguation), several people, including
Douglas M. Stone, United States Marine Corps general officer
Douglas Maxwell Stone (born 1948), Australian geologist and author
Doug Stone (born 1956), American country music singer
Doug Stone (voice actor) (born 1950), American actor

E 
Edmund Stone (c. 1700 – c. 1768), Scottish mathematician
Edward Stone (disambiguation), several people, including
 Edward Stone (natural philosopher) (1702–1768), English cleric and discoverer of active ingredient in aspirin
 Edward James Stone (1831–1897), British astronomer, president of the Royal Astronomical Society 1882–1884
 Edward Albert Stone (1844–1920), Australian judge, chief justice in Western Australia
 Edward Giles Stone (1873–1947), Australian engineer working with reinforced concrete and manufacturing cement
 Edward Durell Stone (1902–1978), American modernist architect
 Edward C. Stone or Ed Stone (born 1936), American astronomer
 Edward R. Stone (died 2012), American swimmer and diver, later an educator
 Edward Daniel Stone (1832–1916), deacon, classical scholar and schoolmaster at Eton College
 Edward Durell Stone Jr. (1932–2009), American landscape architect
Eliphalet Stone (disambiguation), several people
Elizabeth Stone (disambiguation), several people
Elmer Fowler Stone (1887–1936), aviator and commander in the US Coast Guard
Emma Stone (born 1988), American actress and singer
Eugenia Stone (1872–1934), Australian journalist, later Lady Doughty
Ezra Stone (1917–1994), American actor

F 
Francis Gordon Albert Stone (1925–2011), British chemist
Frank Stone (Wisconsin politician) (1876–1937), American politician
Fred Stone (1873–1959), American theater and film actor
Fred Stone (musician) (1935–1986), Canadian musician
Freddie Stone (born 1946), Sly & the Family Stone singer/guitarist
Frederick Stone (1820–1899), American politician from Maryland

G 
Galen L. Stone (1862–1926), American financier and philanthropist
George Stone (disambiguation), several people including
George Stone (basketball) (1946–1993), American basketball player
George Stone (bishop) (1708–1764), Irish archbishop and sermon writer
George Stone (composer) (born 1965), American composer and educator
George Stone (outfielder) (1876–1945), American Major League Baseball batting champion
George Stone (pitcher) (born 1946), American baseball pitcher
George Stone (politician) (1907–2001), British socialist journalist
George Albert Stone III (born 1994), American rapper known professionally as EST Gee
George Cameron Stone (1858–1935), American arms collector and author
George E. Stone (1903–1967), Polish-born American actor
George Frederick Stone (1812–1875), Western Australia Attorney General and census writer
George Lawrence Stone (1886–1967), American drummer and author
Georgie Stone (1909–2010), American silent film child actor in Rio Grande (1920 film)
Georgie Stone (born 2000), Australian actress and transgender rights advocate
Geno Stone (born 1999), American football player
Gordon Stone (rugby union) (Charles Gordon Stone, 1914–2015), Australian rugby union player
Grace Zaring Stone (1891–1991), American author

H 
Hal Stone (died 2007), American actor
Harlan Fiske Stone (1872–1946), Chief Justice of the United States
Henry Stone (disambiguation), several people, including
Henry Stone born Henry David Epstein (1921–2014), American record company executive
Henry Stone (comedian) (born 1988), Australian comedian, writer, and actor
Henry Stone (painter) (1616–1653), English painter
Henry Stone, 1887 mayor of Shire of Hinchinbrook
Herbert L. Stone, an American magazine editor and publisher, and a renowned sailor
Homer A. Stone (1868–1938), American politician
Horace M. Stone (1890–1944), New York politician

I 
I. F. Stone (Isidor Feinstein Stone, 1907–1989), American journalist
Isabelle Stone, (1868–1944), American physicist
Irving Stone (1903–1989), American author
Irwin Stone (1907–1984) biochemist
Ivan Brude Stone (1907-1985), American businessman and politician

J 
J. F. S. Stone (John Frederick Smerdon Stone, c. 1891–1957), British archaeologist
J. N. Stone (1882–1926), college football and basketball coach
J. Riley Stone (1886–1978), Wisconsin State Assemblyman
James Stone (disambiguation), several people including
James Stone, ring name of James Maritato, American wrestler
James Stone (academic administrator), first president of Kalamazoo College, involved in the founding of the United States Republican Party
James Stone (American football) (born 1992), American football player
James Stone (executive) (born 1947), American business executive
Jamie Stone (politician) (born 1954), Scottish politician
James L. Stone (1922–2012), United States Army officer and Medal of Honor recipient
James M. Stone, politician in the Massachusetts House of Representatives
James Riley Stone (1908–2005), Canadian military commander of the Princess Patricia's Canadian Light Infantry during the Battle of Kapyong
James W. Stone (1813–1854), United States Representative from Kentucky
Jamie Magnus Stone (born 1985), Scottish film director and animator
Jeff Stone (disambiguation), several people including
Jeff Stone (author) (active since 2003), American author of Kung Fu themed books for children
Jeff Stone (baseball) (born 1960), American former baseball outfielder
Jeff Stone (California politician) (born 1956), American politician in California State Senate since 2014
Jeff Stone (Wisconsin politician) (born 1961), American politician in Wisconsin State Assembly
B. Jeff Stone (1936–2011), American rockabilly and country singer
Jeffrey Stone (1926–2012), American actor and voice-over artist
Jennifer Stone (born 1993), American actress
Jeremy Stone (born 1935), scientist and activist
Jesse Stone (disambiguation), several people
Jesse Stone (Georgia politician), state senator from Georgia (U.S. state)
Jesse Stone (Wisconsin politician) (born 1836), Lieutenant Governor of Wisconsin from 1899 to 1903
Jimmy Stone (1876–1942), English cricketer
Joanna Stone (born 1972), Australian javelin thrower
John Stone (disambiguation), several people including
John Stone (actor) (1924–2007), Welsh actor
John Stone (American football) (born 1979), American football player
John Stone (Australian politician) (born 1929), Australian Senator and Treasury Secretary
John Stone (baseball) (1905–1955), American baseball outfielder
John Stone (footballer) (born 1953), English footballer
John Stone (martyr) (died c. 1539), English martyr
John Stone (Parliamentarian) (before 1632 – after 1659), English politician
John Stone (MP for Wallingford) (before 1679 – after 1685), English politician
John Stone (producer) (1888–1961), American film producer and screenwriter
John Stone (1765) (1765–1834), American church deacon
John A. Stone (died 1864), American collector and publisher of folk songs
John Augustus Stone (1801–1834), American dramatist and playwright
Sir John Benjamin Stone (1838–1914), British Member of Parliament
John G. Stone (1876–1934), Newfoundland politician
John Hoskins Stone (1750–1804), American politician
John Hurford Stone (1763–1818), British radical political reformer and publisher
John Marshall Stone (1830–1900), American politician and Governor of Mississippi, 1876–1882 and 1890–1896
John N. Stone (1882–1926), American football coach at Clemson University in 1908
John Stone Stone (1869–1943), American mathematician, physicist and inventor
John Timothy Stone (1868–1954), American Presbyterian clergyman
John W. Stone (1838–1922), American politician and jurist from Michigan
John Stone (comics), character in DC Comics Planetary series
Jon Stone (1931–1997), children's television writer
Jordan Stone (born 1984), American soccer player
Joseph Stone (disambiguation), several people including
Joseph Stone, Baron Stone (1903–1986), Officer in the British Army, doctor, and royal peer
Joseph Champlin Stone (1829–1902), U.S. Representative from Iowa
Joseph Stone (screenwriter), screenwriter, see Academy Award for Best Writing (Original Screenplay)
Joshua David Stone (died 2005), author and meditation teacher
J. Stone & Co founded by Josiah Stone, British engineer
Joss Stone (born 1987), British soul singer
Julian Stone (born 1962), British actor
Julius Stone (1907–1985), professor of law

K 
Kate Stone (1841–1907), diarist

L 
Leonard Stone (1923–2011), television and film actor
Lewis Stone, (1879–1953), American actor
Lucinda Hinsdale Stone (1814–1900), American feminist, educator, traveler, writer, philanthropist
Lucy Stone (1818–1893), women's rights activist

M 
Mark Stone (disambiguation), several people including
Mark Stone, real name Mark Kennedy (police officer) (born 1969), undercover Metropolitan Police officer in the UK
Mark Stone (baritone) (born 1969), British baritone
Mark Stone (ice hockey) (born 1992), Canadian ice hockey player
Mark Stone (journalist), Asia Correspondent of Sky News, from 2012
Mark Stone (politician), California politician
Marshall Harvey Stone (1903–1989), American mathematician
Martin Stone (disambiguation), several people, including
Martin Stone (actor), actor in British TV serial The Chronicles of Narnia
Martin Stone (guitarist) (1946–2016), guitarist and rare book dealer
Martin Stone, co-founder of the Carlin Motorsport team
Martin Stone (wrestler), British wrestler
Matt Stone (born 1971), comedian, a co-creator of the TV series South Park
Merlin Stone, sculptor, author, academic
Michael Stone (disambiguation), several people including
Michael Stone (American football) (born 1978), safety for the Houston Texans
Michael Stone (Australian Army officer), Australian Army officer
Michael Stone (author) (born 1966), English author
Michael Stone (criminal) (born 1960), English convicted murderer
Michael Stone (cyclist) (born 1991), American cyclist
Michael Stone (Hustle), a character from the UK television series Hustle
Michael Stone (ice hockey) (born 1990), Canadian ice hockey player
Michael Stone (loyalist) (born 1955), loyalist paramilitary from Northern Ireland
Michael H. Stone, American psychiatrist 
Michael Stone, the nom de guerre of the American and later Israeli military officer Mickey Marcus, David "Mickey" Marcus
Michael Jenifer Stone (1747–1812), U.S. politician
Michael P. W. Stone (1925–1995), Secretary of the U.S. Army
Michael E. Stone (born 1938), scholar of Armenian studies
Mike Stone (disambiguation), several people including
Mike Stone (baseball) (born 1955), American college baseball coach
Mike Stone (defence) (born 1953), Chief Information Officer of the British Ministry of Defence
Mike Stone (ice hockey) (born 1972), retired American professional ice hockey centre
Mike Stone (karate) (born 1944), American martial arts competitor and actor
Mike Stone (lacrosse) (born 1986), current player for the Boston Cannons
Mike Stone (musician) (born 1969), guitarist for the progressive metal band Queensrÿche
Mike Stone (radio personality) (born 1958), sports radio broadcaster in Detroit, Michigan
Mike C. Stone (born 1970), American businessman and politician from North Carolina
Mike Stone (record producer) (1951–2002), English recording engineer and record producer
Mike D. Stone (1949–2017), American recording engineer
Mike Stone, founder of independent record label Clay Records, Stoke-on-Trent
Mike Stone (character), lead character of The Streets of San Francisco
Milburn Stone (1904–1980), actor

N 
Nicholas Stone (1586/87–1647), English sculptor and architect
Nick Stone (disambiguation) several people, including:
Nick Stone (author) (born 1966), British thriller writer
Nick Stone (screenwriter), see Alien Intruder
Nick Stone (footballer born 1981), Australian rules footballer, played with Hawthorn & St Kilda between 2002 and 2005
Nick Stone (footballer born 1972), Australian rules footballer, played with West Coast between 1997 and 2000
Norman Stone (1941–2019), British professor of history

O 
Oliver Stone (born 1946), American motion picture scriptwriter and director

P 
Patrick Thomas Stone (1889–1963) United States federal judge
Perry Stone (radio personality), American radio personality and shock jock
Pete Stone, footballer in the 1956 Summer Olympics
Peter Stone (disambiguation), several people
Peter Stone (footballer) (born 1954), Australian footballer
Pete Stone, Australian footballer in the 1956 Summer Olympics
Peter Stone (professor) (born 1971), professor in computer science at the University of Texas at Austin
Peter G. Stone (born 1957), British archaeologist 
Philip Stone (1924–2003), English film actor

R 
Richard Stone (disambiguation), several people including
Richard Stone (anti-racism activist) (born 1937), British medical doctor and activist
Richard Stone (composer) (1953–2001), American composer
Richard Stone (fencer) (1926–2006), Australian Olympic fencer
Richard Stone (musician),  American lutenist
Richard Stone (painter) (born 1951), British portrait painter
Richard Stone (sculptor and painter) (born 1974), British sculptor and painter
Richard Stone (politician) (born 1928), U.S. Senator from Florida
Richard Stone (priest), Archdeacon of Lewes, 1393–1395
Richard Stone, also known as Charlie Stone (rugby league) (born 1950), English rugby league footballer who played in the 1970s, and 1980s
Richard Stone, member of rock band Mayday (Taiwanese band)
Rick Stone, rugby league football coach
Ricky Stone (born 1975), baseball pitcher
Rob Stone (actor) (born 1962), American actor and director
Rob Stone (entrepreneur) (born 1968), New York-based executive
Rob Stone (rapper) (born 1995), American rapper
Rob Stone (sportscaster), American football and soccer commentator
Robert Stone (disambiguation), several people including
Robert Stone (architect) (born 1968), American architect based in Southern California
Robert Stone (athlete) (born 1965), Australian sprinter
Robert Stone (attorney) (1866–1957), Speaker of the Kansas House of Representatives, 1915
Robert Stone (basketball) (born 1987), Australian basketball player
Robert Stone (British Army officer) (1890–1974)
Robert Stone (composer) (1516–1614), English composer
Robert Stone (cricketer) (1749–1820), English amateur cricketer
Robert Stone (director), Oscar-nominated documentary director for Radio Bikini
Robert Stone (novelist) (1937–2015), U.S. author, journalist
Robert Stone (rugby league) (1956–2005), Australian player for St. George Dragons
Robert Stone (scientist) (born 1922), professor, doctor, director National Institutes of Health
Robert Stone (silversmith) (1903–1990), English silversmith
Robert Stone (trail guide writer) (born 1951), writer of hiking books  
Robert Granville Stone (1907–2002), American philatelic scholar 
Robert King Stone (1822–1872), doctor who served U.S. President Abraham Lincoln during the American Civil War
Robert L. Stone (1922–2009), chief executive of the Hertz Corporation
Robert Spencer Stone (1895–1966), Canadian American pioneer in radiology, radiation therapy and radiation protection
Roger Stone (born 1952) American political consultant, author, lobbyist and strategist
Rose Stone (born 1945), Sly & the Family Stone singer/keyboardist
Royal A. Stone (1875–1942), American jurist
Ruby Stone (1924–2013), American politician
Rupert Stone (1972–2005), American serial killer
Ruth Stone (born 1915), American poet
Ryan Stone (born 1985),  ice hockey player

S 
Sandy Stone (artist) (born 1936), American author and artist
Sean Stone (born 1984), film director, producer, cinematographer, screenwriter, and actor.
Shane Stone, Chief Minister of the Northern Territory (1995–1999)
Sharman Stone (born 1951), member of the Australian House of Representatives
Sharon Stone (born 1958), U.S. actress
Sly Stone (born 1944), Sly & the Family Stone singer-songwriter, frontman
Spencer Stone (born 1992), American  United States Air Force staff sergeant
Steve Stone (disambiguation), several people
Stu Stone, film, television, and voice actor

T 
Tanya Lee Stone (born 1965), American author
Ted G. Stone (1934–2006), Southern Baptist evangelist
Terrence Stone (born 1955), Irish-American voice actor
Thomas Stone (1743–1787), a signer of the US Declaration of Independence as a delegate from Maryland
Thomas Treadwell Stone (1801–1895), American Unitarian pastor and abolitionist
Tobias Stone (died 2012), American bridge player
Tom Stone (disambiguation), several people including
Tom Stone (soccer), head coach of the women's soccer team at Texas Tech University
Tom Stone (photographer) (born 1971), American documentary photographer
Tom Stone (magician) (born 1967), otherwise known as Thomas Bengtsson, Swedish magician, editor and author
Thomas Treadwell Stone (1801–1895), American Unitarian pastor, Abolitionist, and Transcendentalist
Tom Stone (wrestler), American wrestler
Tony Stone (disambiguation), several people including
Tony Stone (filmmaker), American independent filmmaker
Tony Stone (music producer) (born 1982), American music producer and project developer for Christian hip hop artists
Tony Stone (Edinburgh), Scottish entrepreneur and founder of porridge maker Stoats Porridge Bars  
Tuffy Stone, American competitive barbecue chef

U 
Ulysses S. Stone (1878–1962), American politician from Oklahoma

V 
Vet Stone (born 1949), Sly & the Family Stone singer
Vicki Stone (born 1949), American folk artist

W 
Walter Stone (disambiguation), several people including
Walter Napleton Stone (1891–1917), English recipient of the Victoria Cross
Walter F. Stone (1822–1874), Republican politician and judge in Ohio
Walter W. Stone (1910–1981), Australian book publisher and book collector
Walter Stone (screenwriter) (born 1920), chief writer for The Honeymooners
Warren Stanford Stone (1860–1925), railway engineer, headed Brotherhood of Locomotive Engineers from 1903 to 1925.
William Stone (disambiguation), several people including
William Stone (attorney) (1842–1897), Freedmen's Bureau agent, Attorney General of South Carolina
William Stone (baritone) (born 1944), operatic baritone
William Stone (caver) (born 1952), expeditionary caver
William Stone (MP for Salisbury), Member of Parliament (MP) for Salisbury (UK Parliament constituency)
William Stone (Maryland governor) (1603–1660), governor of the colony of Maryland
William Stone (Tennessee politician) (1791–1853), U.S. Representative from Tennessee
William A. Stone (1846–1920), governor of Pennsylvania
William C. Stone, Chairman and CEO of SS&C Technologies
William Carlos Stone (1859–1939), philatelist
William Duncan Stone, Hong Kong judge, see Silver Bauhinia Star
William F. Stone (1909–1973), Virginia lawyer and legislator
William Frank Stone, Canadian ambassador to Afghanistan
William Henry Stone (1828–1901), U.S. representative from Missouri
William Henry Stone (MP) (1834–1896), British politician, MP for Portsmouth, 1865–1874 
William Henry Stone (physician) (1830–1891), English physician, Fellow of the Royal College of Physicians
William Johnson Stone (1841–1923), US Representative from Kentucky
William J. Stone (1848–1918), governor of Missouri
William M. Stone (1827–1893), governor of Iowa
William H. Stone (politician), California politician
William Leete Stone (disambiguation), multiple people
William Murray Stone (1779–1838), American Episcopal bishop of Maryland
William Oliver Stone (1830–1875), American portrait painter
William S. Stone (1910–1968), U.S. Air Force general and U.S. Air Force Academy superintendent
Wilson Stone (disambiguation), several people:
Wilson Stone (scientist) (1907–1968), American geneticist and zoologist
Wilson Stone (politician), US politician from Kentucky
Witmer Stone (1866–1939), American ornithologist, botanist, and mammalogist

Fictional characters
Stone, fictional character in the G.I. Joe universe
Agent Stone, the secondary antagonist of the film Sonic the Hedgehog and its   sequel
Benjamin Stone in the TV series Law & Order
Candace Stone, a character in the TV series You
Charlie Stone, a character in the TV series Veronica Mars
Judge Harold T. Stone in the TV series Night Court
Henry Stone, fictional character in The Fugitive
Dr. Jeremy Stone, character in the film The Andromeda Strain
Jesse Stone, policeman in Jesse Stone novels by Robert B. Parker, also a film series featuring Tom Selleck in the title role
Michael Stone (Hustle) played by Adrian Lester on the BBC drama series Hustle
Lt. Mike Stone played by Karl Malden in The Streets of San Francisco
Nick Stone, fictional hero of several books by Andy McNab
Patsy Stone, character in the comedy  series Absolutely Fabulous
Peter Stone, a character in the drama series Degrassi: The Next Generation
Ramona A. Stone, character in the 1995 David Bowie album Outside
Sam Stone, fictional U.S. veteran of the Vietnam War in the John Prine song of the same name
Sandy Stone (character) played by Barry Humphries
Steven Stone, see List of Pokémon characters
Tom Stone, character in Tom Stone, a 2002–2003 Canadian TV series known in the U.S. as Stone Undercover
Victor Stone, better known by his alias, Cyborg, one of DC's Teen Titans

Families

Stone family in the 2005 comedy The Family Stone
Kelly Stone, played by Craig T. Nelson
Sybil Stone, played by Diane Keaton
Everett Stone, played by Dermot Mulroney
Ben Stone, played by Luke Wilson
Amy Stone, played by Rachel McAdams
Thad Stone, played by Tyrone Giordano
Susannah Stone Trousdale, by Elizabeth Reaser
Stone family in the 2013 comedy series Zach Stone Is Gonna Be Famous
Zach Stone, played by Bo Burnham
Sydney Stone, played by Kari Coleman
Drew Stone, played by Tom Wilson
Andy Stone, played by Cameron Palatas
Stone family in the 2018 drama series Manifest
Michaela Stone, played by Melissa Roxburgh
Ben Stone, played by Josh Dallas
Grace Stone, played by Athena Karkanis
Olive Stone, played by Luna Blaise
Cal Stone, played by Jack Messina and Ty Doran
Steve Stone, played by Malachy Cleary
Karen Stone, played by Geraldine Leer

See also
Stones (surname)
Stone (disambiguation)

References

English-language surnames
Surnames of English origin
Surnames of Old English origin